Mangal Prasad Tharu is a Nepalese politician. He was elected to the Pratinidhi Sabha in the 1999 election on behalf of the Nepali Congress.

In the 2017 Nepalese provincial elections, Tharu ran for the Bardiya 1(B) of the Lumbini Provincial Assembly, but was defeated by Communist Party of Nepal (Maoist Centre) candidate Tilak Ram Sharma.

References

Living people
Nepali Congress politicians from Lumbini Province
Year of birth missing (living people)
Place of birth missing (living people)
Nepal MPs 1999–2002